Renato Cattaneo (6 October 1903 – 1974) was an Italian professional football player and manager who played as a forward.

Club career
Cattaneo played for 8 seasons (225 games, 73 goals) in the Serie A for U.S. Alessandria Calcio 1912 and A.S. Roma.

International career
Cattaneo made his Italy national football team debut on 25 January 1931 in a game against France and scored on his debut in a 5–0 win. He did not appear for the national team again until 1935, when he made his second and last international appearance, being pat of the squad that won the 1933–35 Central European International Cup.

Honours

International 
Italy
 Central European International Cup: 1933–35

Individual 
 4th best goalscorer in Serie A: 1934–35 Serie A (16 goals).

External links
 

1903 births
1974 deaths
Italian footballers
Italy international footballers
Serie A players
Serie B players
Serie C players
U.S. Alessandria Calcio 1912 players
A.S. Roma players
Italian football managers
U.S. Alessandria Calcio 1912 managers
Parma Calcio 1913 managers
A.C. Voghera managers
S.S.D. Sanremese Calcio players
Association football forwards